Ectoedemia fuscata is a moth of the family Nepticulidae. It was described by Anthonie Johannes Theodorus Janse in 1948. It is known from Namibia.

References

Nepticulidae
Moths of Africa
Moths described in 1948